"Death Defying" is a song by Australian rock group Hoodoo Gurus. It was written by Dave Faulkner. and released in February 1986 as the third single from the group's second studio album, Mars Needs Guitars!. The song peaked at No. 43 on the Australian charts.

Faulkner has said the song was written to address the HIV/AIDS crisis that was robbing him of friends in the mid-1980s.

In June 2000, Dave Faulkner said "One of my favourite songs I've written... I have vivid memories of shooting the video in Kakadu National Park after having awoken to see the news footage of the Challenger Space Shuttle exploding during take-off."

Track listing
 7" single (BTS 1692)
 "Death Defying" — 3:19
 "Turkey Dinner" — 4:14

Personnel
 James Baker — drums
 Clyde Bramley — bass, backing vocals  
 Dave Faulkner — lead vocals, guitar
 Mark Kingsmill — drums, cymbals
 Brad Shepherd — guitar, backing vocals, harmonica
 Producer — Charles Fisher
 Engineer — John Bee
 Mastering — Don Bartley

Charts

References

1986 singles
Hoodoo Gurus songs
1985 songs
Songs written by Dave Faulkner (musician)